Meekend Music and Meekend Music 2 are the respective third and fourth extended plays by American hip hop rapper Meek Mill. They were released by Dream Chasers Records and Maybach Music Group digitally for free download and stream via all mixtape platforms on May 6, 2017 and July 4, 2017, respectively. Both Meekend Music and its second counterpart feature production by Honorable C.N.O.T.E., Maaly Raw, Murda Beatz, Stoopid On Da Beat, Dougie, Papamitrou, Mike Will Made It, 30 Roc, Streetrunner and Tarik Azzouz as well as guest appearances from ASAP Ferg, Young Thug, YFN Lucci, Barcelini and Eearz.

The Meekend Music along with the 4/4 extended play projects were used as a prelude to help promote Meek Mill's third studio album, Wins & Losses, which was later released on July 21, 2017.

Track listing

Sample credits
 "Left Hollywood" contains a sample from "I Found", performed by Amber Run.
 "Save Me" contains a sample from "Crave You (Adventure Club Remix)", performed by Flight Facilities.
 "Young Nigga Dreams" contains a sample from "Leave It All Behind (Promid Remix)", performed by Masoud.

References 

2017 EPs
Albums produced by Honorable C.N.O.T.E.
Albums produced by Mike Will Made It
Albums produced by Murda Beatz
Meek Mill EPs
Maybach Music Group albums
EP series